Ayman Al-Hujaili (born 1 July 1998) is a Saudi Arabian professional footballer who plays as an attacking-midfielder for Al-Khaleej.

Career
Ayman Al-Hujaili started his career at the youth teams of hometown club Al-Ansar. On 10 January 2018, Al-Nassr signed Al-Hujaili and Mohammed Al-Shanqiti for a reported fee of SAR600,000. On 1 July 2018, Al-Hujaili returned to Al-Ansar on a free transfer. On 10 July 2019, Damac signed  Al-Hujaili on a three-year deal from Al-Ansar. On 3 September 2021, Al-Hujaili joined Al-Ain on loan. On 13 July 2022, Al-Hujaili joined Al-Khaleej on a two-year deal.

References

External links
 

1998 births
Living people
People from Medina
Association football midfielders
Saudi Arabian footballers
Saudi Arabia youth international footballers
Saudi Second Division players
Saudi First Division League players
Saudi Professional League players
Al-Ansar FC (Medina) players
Al Nassr FC players
Damac FC players
Al-Ain FC (Saudi Arabia) players
Khaleej FC players